Brecht "The Gentle Giant" Wallis (born 6 September 1977) is a Belgian retired kickboxer. He holds notable victories over Jorgen Kruth (twice), Carter Williams, Alexander Ustinov, and Errol Zimmerman.

komt uit Houthalen-Oost

Career and biography

Brecht Wallis started training in judo at the age of 12 and a few years later moved on to Muay Thai. In 2001 he moved to the Netherlands to pursue his professional career at the Siam Gym under trainer Miki Benazzouz.

He made his K-1 debut in 2003 at K-1 Holland GP in Zoetermeer, winning the bout against Swedish fighter Jorgen Kruth by extra round majority decision.

On 14 February 2004 Brecht won his first K-1 tournament in Stockholm, Sweden qualifying for K-1 World GP 2004 in Las Vegas II. In the quarter finals he was matched up against heavy favorite, American Carter Williams, Wallis won the fight by spectacular high kick in round 3. His next opponent in the semis was again Jorgen Kruth. After an evenly fought match Brecht Wallis was announced the winner by unanimous decision and moved on to the tournament finals against American Mighty Mo where he suffered his first loss by a devastating KO in a second round.

After few years out of the K-1 fighting circuit Brecht Wallis made his comeback on 4 May 2007 at the K-1 Fighting Network GP 2007 in Romania, winning the tournament over Doug Viney, Errol Zimmerman and Paula Mataele and he qualified for K-1 World GP 2007 in Amsterdam.

He defeated Martinis Knyzelis via decision at K-1 World Grand Prix 2013 in Vilnius in Vilnius, Lithuania on 27 April 2013.

Titles
 2007 K-1 Fighting Network Romania Champion
 2004 K-1 World Grand Prix in Las Vegas II Runner-up
 2004 K-1 Scandinavia World Qualification Champion

Kickboxing record

|-
|-  bgcolor="#CCFFCC"
| 2013-04-27 || Win ||align=left| Martinis Knyzelis || K-1 World Grand Prix 2013 in Vilnius || Vilnius, Lithuania || Decision || 3 || 3:00
|-  bgcolor="#FFBBBB"
| 2007-06-25 || Loss ||align=left| Björn Bregy || K-1 World Grand Prix 2007 in Amsterdam, Quarter Finals || Amsterdam, Netherlands || Decision (unanimous) || 3 || 3:00
|-  bgcolor="#CCFFCC"
| 2007-05-04 || Win ||align=left| Paula Mataele || K-1 Fighting Network Romania 2007, Final || Bucharest, Romania || KO (straight punch) || 2 || 1:00
|-  bgcolor="#CCFFCC"
| 2007-05-04 || Win ||align=left| Errol Zimmerman || K-1 Fighting Network Romania 2007, Semi Finals || Bucharest, Romania || Decision (majority) || 3 || 3:00
|-  bgcolor="#CCFFCC"
| 2007-05-04 || Win ||align=left| Doug Viney || K-1 Fighting Network Romania 2007, Quarter Finals || Bucharest, Romania || KO (left roundhouse kick) || 3 || 0:50
|-  bgcolor="#FFBBBB"
| 2007-04-07 || Loss  ||align=left| Errol Zimmerman || Balans Fight Night || Tilburg, Netherlands || Decision || ||
|-  bgcolor="#FFBBBB"
| 2006-03-26 || Loss ||align=left| Lloyd van Dams || Balans Fight Night || Tilburg, Netherlands || Decision (Unanimous) || 3 || 3:00
|-  bgcolor="#FFBBBB"
| 2005-10-02 || Loss ||align=left| Alexander Ustinov || The Battle of Arnhem IV || Arnhem, Netherlands || KO || 1 || 
|-  bgcolor="#FFBBBB"
| 2005-09-16 || Loss ||align=left| Daniel Ghiță || Local Kombat 16 || Cluj-Napoca, Romania || Decision (Unanimous) || 3 || 3:00
|-  bgcolor="#CCFFCC"
| 2005-02-05 || Win ||align=left| Alexander Ustinov || Total Kombat 3 || Pitești, Romania || Decision || 5 || 3:00
|-  bgcolor="#CCFFCC"
| 2004-11-12 || Win ||align=left| Aziz Khattou || Fights at the Border III || Lommel, Belgium || Decision (Unanimous) || 3 || 3:00
|-  bgcolor="#c5d2ea"
| 2004-11-04 || Draw ||align=left| Cătălin Zmărăndescu || Total Kombat 1 || Brașov, Romania || Decision || || 
|-  bgcolor="#FFBBBB"
| 2004-08-07 || Loss ||align=left| Mighty Mo || K-1 World Grand Prix 2004 in Las Vegas II, Final || Las Vegas, Nevada, United States || KO (Right overhand) || 2 || 2:55
|-  bgcolor="#CCFFCC"
| 2004-08-07 || Win ||align=left| Jörgen Kruth || K-1 World Grand Prix 2004 in Las Vegas II, Semi Finals || Las Vegas, Nevada, United States || Decision (Unanimous) || 3 || 3:00
|-  bgcolor="#CCFFCC"
| 2004-08-07 || Win ||align=left| Carter Williams || K-1 World Grand Prix 2004 in Las Vegas II, Quarter Finals || Las Vegas, Nevada, United States || KO (high kick) || 3 || 0:55
|-  bgcolor="#CCFFCC"
| 2004-02-14 || Win ||align=left| Rickard Nordstrand || K-1 Scandinavia 2004 World Qualification, Final || Stockholm, Sweden || TKO (Corner stoppage) || 3 || 3:00
|-  bgcolor="#CCFFCC"
| 2004-02-14 || Win ||align=left| Petri Reima || K-1 Scandinavia 2004 World Qualification, Semi Finals || Stockholm, Sweden || Decision (Majority) || 3 || 3:00
|-  bgcolor="#CCFFCC"
| 2004-02-14 || Win ||align=left| Johan Mparmpagiannis || K-1 Scandinavia 2004 World Qualification, Quarter Finals || Stockholm, Sweden || TKO (Fighter gave up) || 2 || 2:35
|-  bgcolor="#CCFFCC"
| 2003-04-06 || Win ||align=left| Jörgen Kruth || K-1 Holland Grand Prix 2003, Quarter Finals || Zoetermeer, Netherlands || Ext.R Decision (Majority) || 4 || 3:00
|-
|-
| colspan=9 | Legend:

References

External links
Siam Gym Official website
K-1 Official website
Brecht Wallis interview
Recent Picture

1977 births
Living people
Flemish sportspeople
Belgian male kickboxers
Heavyweight kickboxers
Belgian Muay Thai practitioners
Sportspeople from Hasselt
Belgian expatriates in the Netherlands
SUPERKOMBAT kickboxers